Guillermo Vilas was the defending champion but did not compete that year.

José Luis Clerc won in the final 6–4, 6–4 against Víctor Pecci.

Seeds
A champion seed is indicated in bold text while text in italics indicates the round in which that seed was eliminated.

  Corrado Barazzutti (semifinals)
  Harold Solomon (semifinals)
  José Higueras (quarterfinals)
  José Luis Clerc (champion)
  Hans Gildemeister (first round)
  Paolo Bertolucci (second round)
  Jaime Fillol (first round)
  Chris Lewis (quarterfinals)

Draw

External links
 1978 South American Championships Singles draw

Singles